Pyroteuthis serrata is a species of squid in the family Pyroteuthidae. It is found north of the tropical convergence in the waters around New Zealand and it does not overlap with Pyroteuthis margaritifera which has a more southerly range.

References

External links
Tree of Life web project: Pyroteuthis serrata

Squid
Molluscs described in 1985